Koduvayur is a fast developing town and a major commercial area in Koduvayur gram panchayat of Kollengode Block Panchayat in Palakkad district in the state of Kerala, India. As of the 2011 Census of India, Koduvayur had a population of 20,703. It is located about 11 km from the district headquarters Palakkad through State Highway 27

History 
Along with the rest of the modern Palakkad district, Koduyavur lies in what was the Malabar District in British India. Koduvayur was one of the 18 asmams that comprised the Cheranad division of the colonial era Ernad Taluk, directly ruled by the Zamorin of Calicut. Its inclusion in this district was documented in William Logan's Malabar Manual published in 1887.

Geography 
Koduvayur is located roughly 10 km south of Palakkad along SH 27. It bordered to the west and northwest by Thenkurissi, to the east by Puthunagaram, to the northeast by Peruvemba, and to the south by Pallassanna. The Malampuzha main canal flows in the south direction through Koduvayur from the Malampuzha Dam.

Attractions 

Koduvayur is home to a temple dedicated to the hindu deity, Shiva. The temple is thought to have a 650 year old history and played an important role in the initial settlement of Koduvaur. It is well-known for its Rathousalvam or chariot festival, which attracts patrons from across Pallakad, as well as the state Kerala. After 18 days of preparation for the festival, three idols or utsava moorthis, process around the temple as well as 9 times around a holy bunyan tree. The procession is accopmonied by celebrations, as well as fireworks as well as  the Annadanam or sacred meal for devotees.

In the center of Koduvayur on Koduvayur Thrippalur Rd. is an outdoor market featuring produce and textiles.

References 

Gram panchayats in Palakkad district